Frank George Aletter (January 14, 1926 – May 13, 2009) was an American theatre, film, and television actor.

Early years
Born in College Point, Queens, New York, Aletter studied acting at the Dramatic Workshop in Manhattan. He served in the United States Army in Germany from January 1946 to 1948.

Career
Aletter's Broadway debut came in 1950 as a replacement for Eli Wallach in Mister Roberts. During the 1950s, he appeared on Broadway in Bells Are Ringing, Time Limit, and Wish You Were Here.

He soon moved on to a prolific television career, appearing as a guest on numerous shows between 1956 and 1988. Aletter starred in three programs in the 1960s, beginning with Bringing Up Buddy, a sitcom during the 1960–1961 season, featuring Aletter with Enid Markey and Doro Merande, who portrayed his overprotective spinster aunts to Aletter's character, Buddy Flower, a bachelor stockbroker. He appeared in the eighth episode of Lucille Ball's The Lucy Show in the 1962 segment "Lucy the Music Lover." Aletter was cast as Dr. Sam Eastman, an ear-nose-throat specialist who adores classical music.

Aletter's wife, Lee Meriwether, a former Miss America, guest-starred once on Bringing Up Buddy. After Bringing Up Buddy, Aletter guest-starred in Target: The Corruptors, The Lloyd Bridges Show, and The Eleventh Hour. He portrayed murderer Harry Collins on the 1963 Perry Mason episode "The Case of the Skeleton's Closet". Also in 1963, he co-starred in The Twilight Zone episode "The Parallel". In 1964, he played murder victim, television news reporter Tommy Towne, in "The Case of the Arrogant Arsonist."

In the 1964–1965 season, Aletter appeared in The Cara Williams Show, with Cara Williams as his television wife. The two worked at the same company in violation of policy that employees could not marry each other and maintain their employment for that company. The show hence focused on how the couple kept the marriage secret.

In the 1965–1966 season, he guest-starred in two episodes of Twelve O'Clock High, once as Lt. Col. Bill Christy and as a sergeant in public relations.

Aletter had another regular role in It's About Time, a Sherwood Schwartz series on CBS in 1966–1967. 

He played Professor Irwin Hayden in the Richard Donner-directed, 36-part, live-action cliffhanger serial Danger Island on The Banana Splits Adventure Hour, which aired on Saturday mornings on NBC from 1968 to 1970. In the fall of 1970, he had a supporting role in the NBC sitcom Nancy.

His movie roles include Mister Roberts, Tora! Tora! Tora!, and Disney's A Tiger Walks.

Aletter portrayed the supporting role of Tom Logan in the " Alcoa Premiere TV Series" Season 2 Episode 5 (S2E5) entitled "Mr. Lucifer", which aired November 1, 1962. The episode was written by sci-fi writer Alfred Bester, with Fred Astaire as the host and in the title role opposite Elizabeth Montgomery.  

Aletter worked with the Screen Actors Guild, having been elected as a vice president in 1987.

Aletter also played George Snyder on the 1970s sitcom Maude in the episode "Love and Marriage" (season one, episode seven).

On January 8, 1978, Aletter played advertising executive Mr. Prescott in the episode "The Commercial" of All in the Family.

Aletter played Harry, a bigamist with six wives to whom Blanche is engaged, in the pilot episode of The Golden Girls.

Personal life
On April 20, 1958, Aletter married Lee Meriwether, actress and former Miss America, in San Francisco, California. They divorced in 1974. They had two daughters, actresses Kyle Aletter-Oldham (best known for her run as one of Barker's Beauties) and Lesley Aletter.

Death
On May 13, 2009, Aletter died of cancer at the age of 83 at his home in Tarzana, California. He was cremated and ashes were taken by his daughter in Chatsworth, California.

Filmography

References

External links

New York Times Movies His filmography there
Frank Aletter, Screen Actor, Dies at 83

1926 births
2009 deaths
Male actors from New York City
American male film actors
American male stage actors
American male television actors
20th-century American male actors
Deaths from cancer in California
Deaths from thyroid cancer
People from Queens, New York
Male actors from Los Angeles
Screen Actors Guild
United States Army soldiers
American expatriates in Germany